Boo-Boo is the debut extended play from Boston indie rock band Big Dipper. The EP was remastered and re-released in 2008 as part of Merge Records' Supercluster: The Big Dipper Anthology set.

Track listing

1987 EPs
Big Dipper (band) albums
Jangle pop EPs